Bruce Lindsley Gillingham (born April 16, 1959) is a United States Navy rear admiral and orthopedic surgeon who serves as the 39th surgeon general of the United States Navy. As surgeon general, Gillingham is dual-hatted as the 43rd chief of the Bureau of Medicine and Surgery and is responsible to the United States Secretary of the Navy, Chief of Naval Operations and director of the Defense Health Agency for all health and medical matters pertaining to the Navy and Marine Corps. He assumed his present assignment on November 1, 2019.

Early life and education

Gillingham was born in Los Angeles County, California and raised in San Diego, graduating from Helix High School in La Mesa in 1977. He earned a Bachelor of Arts in Cultural Anthropology (with high honors) from the University of California, San Diego which he attended from 1977 to 1981 and his medical doctorate from the Uniformed Services University of the Health Sciences which he attended from 1982 to 1986.  He is an inductee in the medical honor society of Alpha Omega Alpha.

Naval career

Gillingham was commissioned into the United States Navy as an ensign in 1982. Early in his career, Gillingham completed a surgical internship and an orthopedic residency at Naval Medical Center San Diego. He was promoted to lieutenant commander in 1990. He also completed subspecialty training as a pediatric orthopedic surgeon at the Hospital for Sick Children in Toronto, Canada in 1995, qualifying as an undersea and diving medical officer.

Gillingham's operational tours include a period aboard the hospital ship  as staff orthopedic surgeon and as director of surgical services. He deployed in support of Operation Iraqi Freedom II as battalion chief of forward professional service for the 1st Force Service Support Group and officer in charge of the Surgical Shock Trauma Platoon, achieving a 98% combat casualty survival rate while providing Echelon II surgical care during Operation Phantom Fury.

His shore assignments include director of Pediatric Orthopedic and Scoliosis Surgery; Associate Orthopedic Residency Program director; and director of Surgical Services. While assigned to Naval Medical Center San Diego, Gillingham played a principal role in establishing the Comprehensive Combat and Complex Casualty Care Center (C5).

Gillingham was commander of Naval Hospital Jacksonville from 2008 to July 2010, United States Pacific Fleet surgeon from 2010 to 2012, and United States Fleet Forces Command fleet surgeon from 2012 to 2013. Promoted to rear admiral (lower half) in July 2013, his first flag assignment was as commander of Navy Medicine West (now Navy Medical Forces Pacific) from 2013 to 2016 and simultaneously dual-hatted as commander of Navy Medical Center San Diego from December 4, 2013 to October 10, 2014. 

He was promoted to rear admiral in 2016 and assigned as the first chief quality officer and deputy chief of medical operations of the Bureau of Medicine and Surgery until 2018. Prior to his present assignment, Gillingham succeeded Tina A. Davidson as director of medical resources, plans, and policy, N0931, of the United States Navy from 2018 to 2019.

Gillingham was confirmed as surgeon general of the Navy on October 31, 2019 and succeeded C. Forrest Faison III on November 1. He is scheduled to retire in March 2023, with a retirement ceremony set for March 27.

Awards and decorations

References

External links

Official U.S. Navy biography

1959 births
Living people
People from Los Angeles County, California
People from San Diego
University of California, San Diego alumni
Military personnel from California
Uniformed Services University of the Health Sciences alumni
United States Navy personnel of the Iraq War
Recipients of the Meritorious Service Medal (United States)
Recipients of the Legion of Merit
United States Navy admirals
Recipients of the Humanitarian Service Medal
Surgeons General of the United States Navy